Valerio Anastasi (born 13 April 1990) is an Italian footballer who plays as a striker for Italian amateurs FC Clivense.

Career
Anastasi made his Serie A debut for A.C. ChievoVerona on 14 December 2008 in a game against F.C. Internazionale Milano when he came on as a substitute in the 86th minute for Luciano.

In summer 2013 Anastasi was signed by Reggiana in a co-ownership deal (while Federico Scappi moved in the opposite direction). In June 2014 Chievo bought back Anastasi.

On 11 July 2014 Anastasi was signed by Monza on a temporary deal.

Anastasi was signed by Pistoiese on 7 January 2015. He was signed by Mantova in the summer of 2015, but returned to Pistoiese in January 2016 on a temporary deal.

On 19 July 2016 Anastasi was signed by Calcio Catania on a 2-year deal.

On 31 January 2017 Messina signed Anastasi on loan.

On 31 January 2018 Anastasi joined Virtus Francavilla. On 14 January 2019, he was released from his Virtus Francavilla contract by mutual consent.

In May 2019, Anastasi joined American club OSA FC, owned by Italien entrepreneur Giuseppe Pezzano.

In September 2021, he returned to play in Italy, joining Terza Categoria amateurs FC Clivense, a club founded by former Chievo star Sergio Pellissier.

References

External links
 Lega Serie A profile 

1990 births
Footballers from Catania
Footballers from Sicily
Living people
Italian footballers
Association football forwards
A.C. ChievoVerona players
U.S. Pergolettese 1932 players
S.S. Villacidrese Calcio players
Calcio Lecco 1912 players
F.C. Südtirol players
S.S. Chieti Calcio players
Santarcangelo Calcio players
A.C. Reggiana 1919 players
A.C. Monza players
U.S. Pistoiese 1921 players
Mantova 1911 players
Catania S.S.D. players
A.C.R. Messina players
U.S. Catanzaro 1929 players
Serie A players
Serie C players
Virtus Francavilla Calcio players